Dumitru Dorian Mitriță (born 23 June 1971) is a retired Romanian footballer who played as a defender. His nephew, Alexandru, is also a professional footballer.

Honours

Club
Universitatea Craiova 	
Liga I: 1990–91
Cupa României: 1990–91

Heerenveen
Eredivisie: Runner-up 1999–2000

Steaua București
Liga I: 2000–01

References

External links

Statistics

1971 births
Living people
Association football defenders
Romanian footballers
Romania international footballers
Romanian expatriate sportspeople in the Netherlands
Romanian expatriate footballers
Liga I players
Eredivisie players
Expatriate footballers in the Netherlands
CS Universitatea Craiova players
SC Heerenveen players
FC Steaua București players
Sportspeople from Craiova